A pet name is a name used to show affection for a person.

Pet name(s) may also refer to:

 Names of pets
 Petname, a security-enhancing software naming system
 "Pet Names", a 1997 song by Smash Mouth from the album Fush Yu Mang